During the 1999–2000 English football season, West Bromwich Albion F.C. competed in the Football League First Division.

Season summary
West Bromwich Albion struggled under the new management of Brian Little and he was sacked in March after just one win from the last 16 league games (between 27 November - 4 March), picking up 9 points from the possible 48 and leaving the club in deep relegation peril. He was replaced by former Stoke City manager Gary Megson, who guided Albion to safety in 21st place.

Kit
West Bromwich Albion retained the previous season's kit, manufactured by Belgian company Patrick and sponsored by the West Bromwich Building Society.

Final league table

Results
West Bromwich Albion's score comes first

Legend

Football League First Division

FA Cup

League Cup

First-team squad
Squad at end of season

Left club during season

Notes

References

West Bromwich Albion F.C. seasons
West Bromwich Albion F.C.